Firefox is a 1982 American action techno-thriller film produced, directed by and starring Clint Eastwood. It is based upon the 1977 novel of the same name by Craig Thomas.

The film was set in Russia, but Cold War considerations had Eastwood's and Fritz Manes's Malpaso Company using Vienna and other locations in Austria to double for many of the Eurasian story locations. One source indicates that the film was shot on a $21 million budget, the largest production budget ever for Malpaso. Another source indicates that over $20 million was spent on special effects.

Plot

A joint British-American plot is devised to steal a highly advanced Soviet fighter aircraft (MiG-31, NATO code name "Firefox") which is capable of Mach 6 (hypersonic flight), is invisible to radar, and carries weapons controlled by thought. Former United States Air Force Major Mitchell Gant, a Vietnam veteran, ex member of the Aggressor squadron and former prisoner of war, infiltrates the Soviet Union, aided by his ability to speak Russian (due to his having had a Russian mother) and a network of Soviet dissidents, three of whom are key scientists working on the fighter itself. His goal is to steal the Firefox and fly it back to friendly territory for analysis.

However, the KGB has got wind of the operation and is already looking for Gant. It is only through the dissidents that Gant remains one step ahead of the KGB and reaches the air base at Bilyarsk, where the Firefox prototype is under heavy guard. The dissidents working on the Firefox help Gant infiltrate the base. Pyotr Baranovich, one of the scientists, briefs Gant on the operation of the aircraft but warns him that there is a second prototype in the hangar that must be destroyed. The diversion will allow Gant to enter the hangar and escape with the first Firefox. Gant knocks out Lt. Colonel Yuri Voskov, a Soviet pilot assigned to take the first prototype on its maiden flight during a visit from the Soviet First Secretary. The scientists cause an explosive disruption, but the second prototype is undamaged. Baranovich is singled out for execution but manages to kill one of the guards with a concealed pistol before he and the other scientists are shot. Gant uses the commotion to enter the Firefox and fly it off the base.

Evading the Soviets' attempts to stop him, Gant barely reaches the Arctic ice pack and lands, making a rendezvous with a US submarine whose crew refuels and rearms the aircraft. However, Gant's last-minute refusal to kill Voskov has consequences; the Soviet pilot flies the second prototype, with orders to intercept him at the North Cape area. Gant completes the rendezvous and is on the way home when Voskov engages him in a dogfight. After a long battle, Gant finally remembers to fire one of his rearward missiles and Voskov's plane is destroyed. Satisfied that there are no other Soviet forces chasing him, Gant begins his flight to safety.

Cast

 Clint Eastwood as Major Mitchell Gant
 Freddie Jones as Kenneth Aubrey
 David Huffman as Captain Buckholz
 Warren Clarke as Pavel Upenskoy
 Ronald Lacey as Dr. Maxim Ilyich Semelovsky
 Kenneth Colley as Colonel Kontarsky
 Klaus Löwitsch as General Vladimirov
 Nigel Hawthorne as Dr. Pyotr Baranovich
 Stefan Schnabel as First Secretary
 Thomas Hill as General Brown
 Curt Lowens as Dr. Schuller
 Clive Merrison as Major Lanyev
 Kai Wulff as Lieutenant Colonel Yuri Voskov
 Dimitra Arliss as Dr. Natalia Baranovich
 Austin Willis as Walters
 Michael Currie as Captain Seerbacker
 Alan Tilvern as Air Marshal Kutuzov
 Oliver Cotton as Dmitri Priabin
 Hugh Fraser as Police Inspector Tortyev
 Wolf Kahler as KGB Chairman Yuri Andropov

Production

The film was based on the creation of a "mythical" super fighter: the MiG-31 Firefox. The original Firefox from the novel was, cosmetically, nearly identical to the MiG-25 (which in reality is actually accurate). The more intimidating version seen in the movie was created specifically for the film, and takes many of its design cues from the SR-71 Blackbird. In the sequel novel, Firefox Down, the Firefox's appearance is described as matching the one in the film. For filming, four large-scale replicas were created, along with one full-size model that had dimensions of 66 feet long, 44 feet wide, and 20 feet high. The full-size model was built from a radio station broadcast-antenna skeleton and was capable of taxiing at 30–40 mph.

Filming occurred in 1981 at a number of locations including Vienna, Austria; Montana; California; London and Greenland's Thule Air Force Base. Hollywood aerial cinematographer Clay Lacy flew second unit aerial sequences in a Learjet 23 high-speed aerial platform, for scenes that were later integrated into the film.

Special effects supervisor John Dykstra pioneered a new technique for shooting the complex flying sequences, called reverse blue-screen photography. This involved coating the model with phosphorus paint and photographing it first with strong lighting against a black background and then with ultraviolet light to create the necessary male and female mattes to separate the foreground model and the background footage. This enabled the shiny black model to be photographed flying against a clear blue sky and gleaming white snow; compare this with traditional bluescreen technique used in The Empire Strikes Back. The original scale model made by Gregory Jein used in the bluescreen work is now on display at the Warner Bros. Museum.

Reception
Author Howard Hughes gave Firefox a negative review, "Watch the trailer, read the book, play the game — just avoid the film, it's another Eiger Sanction. Less a 'Firefox', it's more of a damp squib, or at best a smoldering turkey." Vincent Canby's review in The New York Times made a similar assessment, zeroing in on Eastwood's lack of control over the plot line. "Firefox is only slightly more suspenseful than it is plausible. It's a James Bond movie without girls, a Superman movie without a sense of humor." However, Roger Ebert gave the film three-and-a-half stars out of four, describing it as "a slick, muscular thriller that combines espionage with science fiction. The movie works like a well-crafted machine." Todd McCarthy of Variety panned the film as "a burn-out. Lethargic, characterless and, at 137 minutes, at least a half-hour too long." Gene Siskel of the Chicago Tribune gave the film two-and-a-half stars out of four and wrote that it was "generally entertaining," but "would be a lot more so if Eastwood, who served as producer-director, had excised some of the laborious buildup to the final shootout. Instead, we are asked to sit through some boring patches in which he avoids detection by Russian security officers, who seem to speak Russian or English whenever they like. What's uninteresting about all of this is that we know that Clint is going to make it to the plane. So, let's get on with it." Sheila Benson of the Los Angeles Times called the film "a sagging, overlong disappointment, talky and slow to ignite. It is the first time that Eastwood the director has served Eastwood the actor-icon so badly, and it is unnerving." Gary Arnold of The Washington Post wrote, "Both loyal fans and neutral observers may agree that Eastwood has steered himself into a peculiarly murky flight path on this occasion," calling the plot "far-fetched" and expressing disappointment that "the Firefox doesn't look all that formidable on the screen ... The only in-flight special effect that stirs the imagination is the parallel curtains of water that suddenly erupt in the wake of the plane as it whooshes across the ocean."

As of November 2021, the review aggregation website Rotten Tomatoes gives the film a score of 38% based on reviews from 16 critics.

Video game
A laserdisc arcade game, based on the movie, was released by Atari in 1983.

See also
 List of American films of 1982

References

Citations

Bibliography

 Carlson, Mark. Flying on Film: A Century of Aviation in the Movies, 1912–2012. Duncan, Oklahoma: BearManor Media, 2012. .
 Culhane, John. Special Effects in the Movies: How They Do It. New York: Ballantine Books, 1981. .
 Hardwick, Jack and Ed Schnepf. "A Viewer's Guide to Aviation Movies." The Making of the Great Aviation Films, General Aviation Series, Volume 2, 1989.
 Hughes, Howard. Aim for the Heart. London: I.B. Tauris, 2009. .
 Munn, Michael. Clint Eastwood: Hollywood's Loner. London: Robson Books, 1992. .
 Schickel, Richard. Clint Eastwood: A Biography. New York: Knopf, 1996. .
 Thomas, Craig. Firefox. New York: Holt Rinehart and Winston, 1977. .
 Thomas, Walter. "Filming Firefox." Air Classics, Vol. 44, No. 9, September 1982.

External links
 
 
 
 
 

1982 films
1982 action thriller films
American action thriller films
Cold War aviation films
Films based on British novels
Films directed by Clint Eastwood
Films produced by Clint Eastwood
Films shot in Greenland
Films shot in Vienna
Films set in Alaska
Films set in London
Films set in the Soviet Union
Films set in the Arctic
Films set in 1982
Films about the United States Air Force
Warner Bros. films
Techno-thriller films
Films scored by Maurice Jarre
Brain–computer interfacing in fiction
American anti-communist propaganda films
1980s English-language films
1980s American films